Douglas Spain (born April 15, 1974) is an American film and television actor, director and producer. In 1998 Spain was nominated for an Independent Spirit Award in the category of Best Debut Performance for his role in the film Star Maps. In 1999 he won the Rising Star Award at the Marco Island Film Festival for The Last Best Sunday and in 2006 he won the Camie award at the Character and Morality in Entertainment Awards for his part in The Reading Room. He has since appeared in various features, including Permanent Midnight, But I'm a Cheerleader, A Time for Dancing, What's Cooking?, Cherry Falls, Delivering Milo and Still Green.

On television, Spain appeared in  Band of Brothers, and has made guest appearances on Star Trek: Voyager, Pacific Blue, Nash Bridges, Brooklyn South, Becker, The Practice, JAG, Family Law, CSI: Miami, The Mentalist, NCIS,  and House M.D. He has directed the films Charity, Online, Crazy, Crazy Too and The Monster.

Personal life
Spain came out as gay via Facebook on January 26, 2012, and in an interview with The Advocate on January 27, 2012.

Filmography
 1995: Star Trek: Voyager as young Chakotay in Season 2 Episode 9
 1997: Riot as Manuel
 1997: 12 Angry Men as The Accused
 1998: Star Maps as Carlos Amado
 1998: Ricochet River as Jesse Howl
 1998: Permanent Midnight as Miguel
 1998: Becker (TV series) as Javier Cruz in Season 1 Episode 15
 1999: But I'm a Cheerleader as Andre
 2000: A Time for Dancing as Mike
 2000: What's Cooking? as Tony Avila
 2000: Cherry Falls as Mark
 2000: Rave as Daffy
 2001: Delivering Milo as Mr. Gordon
 2001: Band of Brothers (TV miniseries) as Pvt. Antonio Garcia
 2005: Next Exit as Charles
 2005: The Reading Room (TV movie) as Javier
 2006: Walkout (film) (HBO) as Dave Sanchez
 2007: Still Green as Milo
 2007: Carts as Roberto
 2007: The Memory Thief as Dominic
 2008: Hotel California as Manny Ramos
 2008: The Mentalist as Hector Romerez
 2009: American Cowslip as Jorge
 2017: Badsville as Charlie (also producer)
 2019: The Assent as Brother Michael

References

External links

Official site

1974 births
Living people
Male actors from Los Angeles
American male film actors
American male television actors
American gay actors
LGBT Hispanic and Latino American people
Guatemalan LGBT people
Hispanic and Latino American male actors
21st-century American LGBT people